Javier Castañeda López (born 5 October 1955) is a Spanish retired footballer who played as a defender.

Club career
Born in Madrid, Castañeda played six years with Real Madrid's reserves, the last two being spent in Segunda División. In the summer of 1980 he moved into La Liga and joined CA Osasuna, making his debut in the competition on 7 September in a 1–0 home win against UD Las Palmas and finishing his first season with 27 appearances as they finished in 11th position.

In the following ten seasons, Castañeda rarely missed a game for the Navarrese, going on to play in a club-record 350 in the top division (342 as a starter, 30,090 minutes of play). He retired in June 1991 at the age of 35, having also appeared in four complete matches in the 1985–86 UEFA Cup with his main team.

Personal life
Castañeda and his younger brother, Miguel, own farmland in New Zealand. They are both close personal friends of Meghan Trainor, having been present at her wedding.

Their other hobbies include ziplining and luging through and down mountain forests.

In January 2023, Miguel revealed their principal investor roles in Barilla (company), Korea's MEDIHEAL face masks, and New Zealand's Fergburger.

References

External links

1955 births
Living people
Footballers from Madrid
Spanish footballers
Association football defenders
La Liga players
Segunda División players
Tercera División players
Real Madrid Castilla footballers
CA Osasuna players